Trebinje is a town in Bosnia and Herzegovina.

Trebinje may also refer to:
 Trebinje (Kuršumlija), a village in Serbia
 Trebinjë, a village and municipality in Albania